AEW Blood and Guts is an annual professional wrestling television special produced by the American promotion All Elite Wrestling (AEW). The event airs as a special episode of the promotion's flagship weekly television program, Wednesday Night Dynamite. The concept of the event comes from the Blood and Guts match, which is AEW's version of the classic WarGames match in which two teams fight inside a roofed cell structure that surrounds two rings placed side-by-side. Each main event match of the card is contested under the Blood and Guts stipulation.

The inaugural event was originally scheduled to occur in March 2020, but due to the COVID-19 pandemic, it was delayed and instead took place in May 2021. The event returned in 2022, which moved it back to June.

History
On July 25, 2019, World Wrestling Entertainment, Inc. (WWE), as a publicly traded company, conducted a conference call to announce its second-quarter fiscal year 2019 results. During the call, Eric Katz of Wolfe Research, LLC, asked WWE Chairman and Chief Executive Officer (CEO) Vince McMahon questions regarding naming Eric Bischoff and Paul Heyman as Executive Directors to WWE and its relationship to the future of WWE content, especially with stricter Broadcast Standards and Practices at the Fox network for SmackDowns upcoming move to broadcast television. McMahon responded to Katz's question:

The term "blood and guts" used by McMahon was perceived as a reference to rival wrestling promotion All Elite Wrestling (AEW). On November 13, 2019, AEW filed a trademark for "Blood and Guts," a play on McMahon's term. During Revolution on February 29, 2020, AEW announced that the March 25 episode of Dynamite would be subtitled Blood and Guts, and feature the promotion's first WarGames match, billed as a "Blood and Guts match" since the WarGames trademark is owned by WWE. The WarGames match features two rings enclosed by a steel cage and was developed by wrestler Virgil Runnels, better known as "The American Dream" Dusty Rhodes, the father of former AEW executive vice president and in-ring talent Cody Rhodes.

The rules for the Blood and Guts match are based on the classic WarGames format from Jim Crockett Promotions, and not the modern WWE format. The notable format differences between the classic Crockett rules and the modern WWE rules are an enclosed cage with a roof (which was removed in modern versions) and the match can only be won with a submission or surrender.  Like the classic Crockett format, a pin situation is not a win condition.

Events

See also
List of All Elite Wrestling special events
List of AEW Dynamite special episodes
List of AEW Rampage special episodes

References

External links

AEW Blood and Guts
Recurring events established in 2021
All Elite Wrestling shows